The Great Salt Pond Archeological District is a historic district in New Shoreham, Rhode Island. The district was added to the National Register of Historic Places in 1990.

The Great Salt Pond is a round and almost entirely enclosed body of water separating the north and south regions of Block Island. The pond has a small channel on its north west shore connecting it with Block Island Sound. The opening is artificial and was dug out in 1895 to make a harbor in the south part of the pond.

The shores of the pond have a long history of human use, as the area was one of the primary areas of residence by Native Americans both before and after contact with Europeans. Evidence of occupation dates as far back as the Middle Woodland Period, and includes the site of a palisaded fortification.

See also
National Register of Historic Places listings in Washington County, Rhode Island

References

New Shoreham, Rhode Island
Historic districts in Washington County, Rhode Island
Archaeological sites on the National Register of Historic Places in Rhode Island
Historic districts on the National Register of Historic Places in Rhode Island
National Register of Historic Places in Washington County, Rhode Island